Laurence Acton (died 1386/87) was an English politician who was an MP during the 1370s and a six-time bailiff of Newcastle. The son of William Acton, his elder brother, also named William, and his namesake son were both MPs.

References

Bailiffs
Politicians from Newcastle upon Tyne
Members of the Parliament of England (pre-1707)